Breakwater is a residential and industrial suburb of Geelong, Victoria, Australia, located on the Barwon River, 4 km south-south-east of the Geelong central business district. At the 2016 census Breakwater had a population of 1,014. Breakwater is home to the Geelong Racing Club, Geelong Racecourse and the Geelong Showgrounds.

History 
The name Breakwater originated from a rock ford constructed across the Barwon River by Geelong's first Police magistrate, Captain Foster Fyans, in 1837. The ford stopped the inflow of salt water to the fresh water river, supplying the town with fresh river water.

A Post Office opened on 1 January 1867 and closed in 1982.

Land between the industrial area and the river is prone to flooding.

Heritage sites

Breakwater contains a number of heritage listed sites, including:

 42 Leather Street, Barwon Sewer Aqueduct
 Tucker Street, Sunnyside Wool Scour

Census populations 
The Census result of given below years

 1861 - 136
 1871 - 312
 1981 - 1,521

References

External links
 Australian Places - Breakwater

Suburbs of Geelong